Shalamcheh is a town located in Khuzestan Province, Iran. It is situated on the border with Iraq, north-west of Abadan. The town was one of the main sites of invasion of Saddam Hussein's Iraq in the Iran–Iraq War. Some 50,000 Iranians died in the fighting around the town, and there is today a war memorial in their memory.
One of the two railway projects connecting Iran to Iraq is through Shalamcheh.

See also
Khosravi

References

Populated places in Khorramshahr County
Iran–Iraq border crossings